Arnold M. Zwicky (born September 6, 1940) is a perennial visiting professor of linguistics at Stanford University, and Distinguished University Professor Emeritus of linguistics at the Ohio State University.

Early life and education 
Zwicky was born on September 6, 1940, in Allentown, Pennsylvania. He received a Bachelor of Arts in mathematics at Princeton University (1962). He was a student of Morris Halle at the Massachusetts Institute of Technology (MIT) and received a Doctor of Philosophy in Linguistics in 1965.

Career 
Zwicky has made notable contributions to fields of phonology (half-rhymes), morphology (realizational morphology, rules of referral), syntax (clitics, construction grammar), interfaces (the Principle of Phonology-Free Syntax), sociolinguistics and American dialectology.

He coined the term "recency illusion", the belief that a word, meaning, grammatical construction or phrase is of recent origin when it is in fact of long-established usage. For example, the figurative use of the intensifier "literally" is often perceived to have recent origin, but in fact it dates back several centuries. The phenomenon is thought to be caused by selective attention.

At the Linguistic Society of America's 1999 Summer Institute (held at UIUC) he was the Edward Sapir professor, the most prestigious chair of this organization, of which he is a past president.

He is one of the editors of Handbook of Morphology, among other published works.  He is also well known as a frequent contributor to the linguistics blog Language Log, as well as his own personal blog that largely focuses on linguistics issues.

Zwicky is a former board member of the National Organization of Gay and Lesbian Scientists and Technical Professionals, who chose him as 2008 GLBT Scientist of the Year.

Selected publications 

 1977: On Clitics. Indiana University Linguistics Club.
 1983: Cliticization vs. Inflection: English n't. With Geoffrey K. Pullum Language 59 (3), 502–513.
 1985: Clitics and Particles. Language 61 (2), 283–305.
 1987: Suppressing the Zs. Journal of Linguistics Vol. 23 (1), 133–148.
 1996: Approaching Second: Second Position Clitics and Related Phenomena. Edited with Aaron L. Halpern. Stanford, CA: CSLI Publications.
 2001: The Handbook of Morphology. Edited with Andrew Spencer. Hoboken: Wiley.

See also 

 LGBT people in science

References

External links 
Arnold Zwicky's blog
Arnold Zwicky on Stanford Profiles

Linguists from the United States
Stanford University Department of Linguistics faculty
Ohio State University faculty
Living people
American LGBT scientists
Phonologists
Morphologists
Syntacticians
Sociolinguists
Dialectologists
Linguistic Society of America presidents
1940 births
21st-century American LGBT people
Fellows of the Linguistic Society of America